Shenyang Aircraft Corporation (SAC) or Shenyang Aerospace Corporation is a Chinese civilian and military aircraft manufacturer located in Shenyang, Liaoning, a subsidiary of the state-owned aircraft manufacturer AVIC. Founded in 1951 as the classified 112 Factory, it is the earliest aircraft manufacturer in the People's Republic of China.  Many aircraft manufacturers in China such as Chengdu Aircraft Industry Group or Guizhou Aircraft Industry Co. were founded with help from Shenyang. The company mainly focuses on designing and manufacturing civilian and military aircraft, as well as their related components including jet engines. It is also involved in the development of UAVs and drones.

Shenyang Aerospace has been cited for its success in developing China's second fifth-generation aircraft and stealth fighter jet, after Chengdu Aircraft Industry Group, and the first line of Chinese fighter jet engines. Its achievements, together with Chengdu Aircraft, led China to become the second country in the world (after the U.S.) to possess fifth-generation and stealth technology, as well as the production of its own domestic engines.

Partnership with Cessna
On 27 November 2007, Cessna announced that the Cessna 162 Light Sport Aircraft would be produced by the Shenyang Aircraft Corporation. The first production Cessna 162 took flight at Shenyang on 17 September 2009. The aircraft was not a success and production ended in January 2014 after 192 were sold.

Facilities
 Shenyang Airframe Plant
 Shenyang Aircraft Design Institute

Products

Fighters
 J-2, Chinese variant of the Mikoyan-Gurevich MiG-15.
 Shenyang J-5, Chinese variant of the Mikoyan-Gurevich MiG-17.
 Shenyang J-6, Chinese variant of the Mikoyan-Gurevich MiG-19.
 Chengdu J-7, Chinese variant of the Mikoyan-Gurevich MiG-21. Production was moved to Chengdu in the 1970s.
 Shenyang J-8, Indigenously developed 3rd generation fighter aircraft. NATO reporting name Finback.
 Shenyang J-11, Chinese variant of the Russian Sukhoi Su-27.
 Shenyang J-13, Cancelled air superiority fighter project.
 Shenyang J-15, Carrier-borne naval multirole fighter
 Shenyang J-16, Strike fighter aircraft

In development 

 Shenyang J-31, A mid weight fifth-generation fighter aircraft in testing phase.

Civilian jetliners
 ACAC ARJ21 Xiangfeng, collaborating with other companies of AVIC I.

Bombers
 Xian H-6 bomber: Chinese variant of the Soviet Tupolev Tu-16 Badger. Collaboration with Xi'an Aircraft Industrial Corporation.
 Nanchang Q-5 fighter bomber.  Designed in Shenyang and later moved to Nanchang Aircraft for production.

General aviation aircraft
 Shenyang type 5: Chinese production version of the Russian Yakovlev Yak-12 utility aircraft.
 Cessna 162

Engines
 Turbofan WS-10, Taihang
 Turbojet WP-14, Kunlun
 Turbofan WS-20

Parts
 Associated Lyulka AL-31 turbofan engine
 Whole tail sections and cargo doors for Boeing
 Parts for Bombardier Aerospace (CSeries fuselage) and McDonnell Douglas

UAVs and Drones
 Shenyang BA-5

Canceled
 Shenyang J-13: a cancelled 1971 Chinese light fighter aircraft

See also

 ACAC consortium
 Aviation Industry Corporation of China
 Changhe Aircraft Industries Corporation
 Chengdu Aircraft Industry Group
 Guizhou Aircraft Industry Co.
 Harbin Aircraft Industry Group
 Hongdu Aviation Industry Corporation
 Shaanxi Aircraft Company
 Shanghai Aviation Industrial Company
 Xi'an Aircraft Industrial Corporation

References

 Shenyang Aircraft Corp

External links

 

1953 establishments in China
Aircraft manufacturers of China
Companies based in Shenyang
Defence companies of the People's Republic of China
Manufacturing companies established in 1953